Saky Raion is one of the 25 regions of the Autonomous Republic of Crimea, a territory recognized by a majority of countries as part of Ukraine and incorporated by Russia as the Republic of Crimea. Its administrative center is the city of Saky, which is not a part of the district. Population: 

The district includes the urban-type settlement of Novofedorivka.

References

External links
 

Raions of Crimea